Lesbian, gay, bisexual, and transgender (LGBT) people in South Korea face legal challenges and discrimination not experienced by non-LGBT individuals. While male and female same-sex sexual activity is legal in South Korea, marriage or other forms of legal partnership are not available to same-sex couples. South Korean national law does not provide any anti-discrimination protections for LGBT people, nor does it prohibit hate crimes based on sexual orientation and gender identity.

Homosexuality remains quite taboo in South Korean society. Homosexuality is not specifically mentioned in either the South Korean Constitution or in the Civil Penal Code, although article 2 of the National Human Rights Commission Of Korea Act includes sexual orientation as one of the protected classes. Transgender or non-binary people are excluded from military service.

Transgender people are allowed to undergo gender affirming care in South Korea after the age of 20, and can change their gender identity on official documents. Harisu is South Korea's first transgender entertainer, and in 2002 became the second person in South Korea to legally change sex.

Gay and lesbian Koreans still face difficulties at home and work, and many prefer not to reveal their sexual orientation to family, friends or co-workers out of fear of discrimination and being ostracized.

History

Although there is very little mention of homosexuality in Korean literature or traditional historical accounts, several members of the nobility and Buddhist monks have been known to either profess their attraction to members of the same sex or else be actively involved with them.

During the Silla Dynasty, several noble men and women are known to have engaged in homosexual activity and express their love for a person of the same sex. Among these is King Hyegong. In addition, the hwarang (Hangul: 화랑; Hanja: 花郞), also known as the Flowering Knights or the Flowering Boys, were an elite group of male Silla warriors, famous for their homoeroticism and femininity. The Samguk yusa, a collection of Korean legends, folktales and historical accounts, contains verses that reveal the homosexual nature of the hwarang.

During the Goryeo Dynasty, King Mokjong (980–1009) and King Gongmin (1325–1374) are both on record as having kept several wonchung ("male lovers") in their courts as "little-brother attendants" (chajewhi) who served as sexual partners. After the death of his wife, King Gongmin even went so far as to create a ministry whose sole purpose was to seek out and recruit young men from all over the country to serve in his court. Others including King Chungseon had long-term relationships with men. Those who were in same-sex relationships were referred to as yongyang jichong, whose translation has been subject to argument, but is generally viewed as meaning the "dragon and the sun".

In the Joseon Era, several noblemen and noblewomen are known to have had same-sex sexual relations, including Royal Noble Consort Sun-bin Bong who was the second consort of Munjong of Joseon and King Sejong's daughter-in-law who was banished after it was discovered that she was sleeping with one of her maids. During this period, there were travelling theater groups known as namsadang which included underaged males called midong ("beautiful boys"). The troupes provided "various types of entertainment, including band music, song, masked dance, circus, and puppet plays," sometimes with graphic representations of same-sex intercourse. The namsandang were further separated in two groups; the "butch" members (숫동모, sutdongmo) and the "queens" (여동모, yeodongmo, or 암동모, amdongmo).

The spread of Neo-Confucianism in South Korea shaped the moral system, the way of life, and social relations of Korean society. Neo-Confucianism emphasizes strict obedience to the social order and the family unit, which referred to a husband and wife. Homosexuality and same-sex relationships were viewed as disturbing this system and thus were perceived as "deviant" or "immoral". Since the 1910s, Neo-Confucianism has lost a lot of influence, though still today Confucian ideas and practices significantly define South Korean culture and society.

Homosexuality was officially declassified as "harmful and obscene" in 2003.

In August 2017, the Supreme Court ordered the government to allow "Beyond the Rainbow", an LGBT rights foundation, to register as a charity with the Ministry of Justice. Without official registration, the foundation was unable to receive tax-deductible donations and operate in full compliance with the law. In 2014, the South Korean Government voted in favor of a symbolic United Nations resolution aimed at combating discrimination against LGBT people.

Recognition of same-sex relationships

Same-sex marriages and civil unions are not legally recognized in South Korea. In October 2019, the Government of South Korea announced it would recognize the same-sex spouses of foreign diplomats, but it would not recognize the same-sex spouses of South Korean diplomats who serve overseas.

In October 2014, some members of the Democratic Party introduced a bill to recognize same-sex partnerships to the National Assembly. However, the bill was never brought to a vote.

In July 2015, actor Kim Jho Gwangsoo and his partner Kim Seung-Hwan filed a lawsuit seeking legal status for their marriage. The lawsuit was rejected by the Seoul Western District Court in May 2016 and by an appeals court in December 2016. The couple subsequently announced that they would bring their case to the Supreme Court.

In May 2019, Kim Gyu-Jin married her wife in a Manhattan marriage bureau, New York City to obtain a marriage registration. Then they had a factory wedding in Seoul in November. In May 2020, to celebrate the 1st wedding anniversary, Kim Gyu-Jin and her spouse filed a marriage registration with the Jongno-Gu Office but received the notice of non-repair. She shared her same-sex marriage experiences on her blog 'Living as an openly queer in Korea'. After this, she interviewed her experiences including KBS, a Korean national broadcaster on prime time. Another is on the main news page of KakaoTalk, South Korea's leading messaging app. The article received about 10,000 comments, 80 percent of which were negative, she said. Some people told the couple to “Get out of Korea.” Others worried that society and families would fall apart on a tide of lesbian weddings. Some replies were intensely malicious and threatening. After consulting a lawyer, and pushing the police to talk to portal sites, she sued the 100 most malicious commentators.

In January 2021, Seoul's Ministry of Gender Equality and Family announced it will propose changes to civil and welfare regulations so that single parents and unmarried, cohabitating partners can become legal families. A ministry official, however, said that the reform would only apply to heterosexual couples. "There hasn't been any discussion nor even a consideration about same-sex couples," the official, who was not authorized to speak with the media and asked for anonymity, wrote in an email.

Discrimination protections
The National Human Rights Commission Act, enacted in 2001, established the National Human Rights Commission of Korea (NHRCK). Under South Korean law, the NHRCK is an independent commission for protecting, advocating, and promoting human rights. The National Human Rights Commission Act explicitly includes sexual orientation as an anti-discrimination ground. When discriminatory acts are found to have occurred, the National Human Rights Commission of Korea may conduct investigations on such acts and recommend non-binding relief measures, disciplinary actions or report them to the authorities. Even so, the body does not have coercive powers. 

South Korean national law, however, does not prohibit discrimination based on sexual orientation or gender identity. Over the years, a repeated cycle of anti-discrimination legislation has been proposed and abandoned. An anti-discrimination bill was submitted in 2007 by the Ministry of Justice, but a movement of opposition arose and led to the bill being abandoned. In 2013, a bill to include sexual orientation, religion and political ideology to the country's anti-discrimination law was introduced. It received fierce opposition from conservative groups. During the 17th National Assembly, an anti-discrimination bill was sponsored by the late Roh Hoe-chan. Another bill was sponsored by former lawmaker Kwon Young-gil during the 18th National Assembly. Both bills were dropped before any debate had taken place. During the 19th National Assembly, former lawmakers Kim Han-gil and Choi Won-sik sponsored bills only to withdraw them after encountering objections. In 2019, the National Assembly failed to hold a debate on comprehensive anti-discrimination legislation. Objections to the anti-discrimination bills come chiefly from conservative Protestants. During the 20th National Assembly, lawmaker Kim Tae-heum (Liberty Korea Party) presented a bill that would have removed the category of sexual orientation from the National Human Rights Commission Act. In 2019, politician Ahn Sang-soo introduced another bill to repeal the protection for sexual orientation in the National Human Rights Commission Act and to restrict legal recognition of gender to a biological basis. The bill was supported by 40 of the Assembly's 300 MPs, drawing criticism and protests from LGBT advocates and Amnesty International.

As of 2019, the Justice Party planned to prepare a comprehensive anti-discrimination bill. A 2014 poll found that 85% of South Koreans believed gay people should be protected from discrimination. According to a more recent poll, conducted in 2017 by Gallup Korea, 90% of South Koreans said they supported equal employment opportunities for LGBT people.

On 23 December, in a special report issued by the National Human Rights Commission, President Moon Jae-in stressed the need for equality legislation. While acknowledging there is some opposition to the enactment of an anti-discrimination law, Moon said he expects the National Assembly to actively discuss such legislation in the near future. The U.N. Committee on the Elimination of Discrimination against Women, the Committee on Economic, Social and Cultural Rights, the Committee on the Rights of the Child, the Committee on the Elimination of Racial Discrimination, and the Human Rights Committee have recommended the enactment of anti-discrimination legislation. As a presidential candidate in 2012, Moon cited a comprehensive anti-discrimination act as one of the top 10 priorities of his human rights policy. Since taking office in 2017, Moon has been reluctant to enact such legislation amid opposition from within his governing Democratic Party of Korea.

In 2022, NBC News spoke with progressive South Korean lawmakers and dozens of LGBTQ+ South Koreans across the country; most said a comprehensive nondiscrimination bill that would outlaw discrimination against all minority groups, including the LGBTQ+ community, is key first step toward legal equality. In the view of activists, the codification of a nondiscrimination law could catalyze additional legal protections, like same-sex marriage, domestic partnerships, and joint adoption for same-sex couples. Nevertheless, some LGBTQ+ activists said the bill alone could still ease their everyday sense of danger. June Green, a trans-male bartender from Seoul, told NBC News reporter Michael Mitsanas that "because we still don't have a nondiscrimination bill, I often feel threatened to just walk on the street."

On LGBTQ+ rights, South Korea is an outlier among OECD nations, according to an NBC News analysis. On the 2019 Franklin & Marshall Global Barometer of Gay Rights, OECD nations averaged a grade of B. South Korea, however, was one of three OECD countries to earn an "F." Countries that receive an F are "persecuting" their LGBTQ+ communities.

Province-level protections

Currently, 15 local governments in South Korea have enacted anti-discrimination policies and provisions (not laws) that include sexual orientation. This includes five first-level subdivisions: South Gyeongsang Province, Seoul, Jeju Province, North Chungcheong Province and South Chungcheong Province.

South Gyeongsang Province enacted anti-discrimination policies in March 2010. The policy states that "citizens shall not be discriminated, without reasonable grounds, on the grounds of sex, religion, disability, age, social status, region of origin, state of origin, ethnic origin, physical condition such as appearance, medical history, marital status, political opinion, and sexual orientation".

Seoul passed regional policies aimed at combatting discrimination on the grounds mentioned in the National Human Rights Commission Act in September 2012. The passage of this policy received fierce and violent opposition from conservative groups.

Similarly, both Jeju Province and North Chungcheong Province passed similar policies in October 2015 banning discrimination on the grounds mentioned in the National Human Rights Commission Act. South Chungcheong Province followed suit in October 2018.

Several second-level jurisdictions have also enacted anti-discrimination provisions that cover sexual orientation. These are:

 Yeonje District, Busan (November 2010)
 Suyeong District, Busan (December 2010)
 Buk District, Ulsan (January 2011)
 Nam District, Busan (May 2011)
 Buk District, Busan (March 2012)
 Jung District, Ulsan (April 2013)
 Dong District, Daejeon (April 2015)
 Haeundae District, Busan (July 2015)
 Eunpyeong District, Seoul (October 2015)
 Hwasun County, South Jeolla (December 2017)

Anti-bullying and student ordinances
Gyeonggi Province banned bullying against students on the basis of their sexual orientation in October 2010. Gwangju followed suit in October 2011, and Seoul in January 2012. Seoul's ordinance on the protection of children and youth also includes gender identity, thereby protecting transgender students from discrimination. North Jeolla Province enacted an ordinance banning bullying against "sexual minorities" in January 2013.

There is growing debate and discussing in South Gyeongsang Province, Incheon, and Busan for the passage of a similar law.

Other anti-discrimination provisions
In addition, other symbolic protections for "sexual minorities". Police officers and Coast Guard personnel are forbidden from outing an LGBT person against their own will.

In November 2017, the city of Geoje passed a policy that prohibits broadcasting agencies from spreading information encouraging discrimination against "sexual minorities". Hongcheon County and Gangneung followed suit in November and December 2018, respectively.

Furthermore, several activist groups and coalitions have been created within the South Korean LGBT community to advocate for human rights for LGBT people. For example, the "Rainbow Action against Sexual Minority Discrimination," otherwise known as "Rainbow Action," is a coalition of several non-governmental organizations that work to promote and expand LGBT rights in Korea. Rainbow Action works to address several issues within the Korean community including perspectives on conversion therapy, HIV-related stigma, hate crimes, intersex persons, and more.

Constitutional rights
The Constitution of South Korea prohibits discrimination on the basis of sex, religion, and social status. According to the Ministry of Justice, the term "social status" includes LGBT people. However, there are no remedies for LGBT victims of discrimination nor are these "protections" enforced.

Health care insurance benefits
On 7 January 2022, a South Korean same-sex couple was refused health care insurance benefits by a lower court. In its ruling, the Seoul Administrative Court said matrimony in South Korea is still considered a union between a man and a woman. This ruling was overturned the following year, on 21 February 2023, after the Seoul High Court decided that the state's health insurer – the National Health Insurance Service – should provide spousal coverage to a same-sex couple.

Military service

Consensual same-sex intercourse is a crime in the South Korean military. Article 92-6 of the 1962 Military Criminal Act criminalizes “anal intercourse” or “any other indecent acts” between military personnel, and carries a punishment of up to two years in prison. In April 2022, the Supreme Court found that the law cannot be applied to consensual acts that occur off-base during off-duty hours. Activists have called for the Constitutional Court to rule the law unconstitutional.

Military service is mandatory for all male citizens in South Korea. Enlistees are drafted through the Military Manpower Administration (MMA) which administers a "psychology test" at the time of enlistment that includes several questions regarding the enlistee's sexual preferences. Homosexual military members in active duty are categorized as having a "personality disorder" or "behavioral disability" and can either be institutionalized or dishonorably discharged.

In 2017, Amnesty International accused the military of engaging in a "gay witch hunt" to expose and punish gay personnel, by criminally charging 32 military personnel for "sodomy or other disgraceful conduct", including sentencing a gay soldier to six months imprisonment for having consensual sex with another gay soldier in a private place.  

In January 2020, staff sergeant Byun Hui-su, a transgender conscript, was dismissed from military after undergoing gender affirming care, and later committed suicide. In 2021, a South Korean district court posthumously reinstated her. 

In April 2022, the highest ordinary court of South Korea limited the 'sodomy' law's scope, allowing conscripts to engage in same-sex intercourse "provided that they are off base barracks and/or off duty".

Transgender rights

Transgender and gender diverse South Koreans face discriminatory challenges not experienced by other LGBT South Koreans. 

Some reports indicate that the country's transgender population is estimated to be around 1,000–1,200 people.

Legal documents

The seventh digit of the country's national identification number, known as the National Pension Number, corresponds to one's sex assigned at birth,  amounting to what some LGBTQ activists call "forced outing" in job interviews. In June 2006, however, the Supreme Court ruled that transgender individuals who had undergone successful sex reassignment surgery have the right to declare their new sex in all legal documents. This includes the right to request a correction of their gender-on-file in all public and government records such as the census registry. In March 2013, the Seoul Western District Court ruled that five female-to-male transgender individuals can be registered as male without undergoing sex reassignment surgery. On 16 February 2017, the Cheongju District Court ruled that a male-to-female transgender individual could be registered as a female without undergoing surgery.

Military service

In March 2021, Byun Hui-su - South Korea's first transgender soldier, who was forcibly discharged after undergoing gender affirming care - died by suicide. The Defense Ministry classified her loss of male genitals as a mental or physical handicap, and a military panel ruled in early 2020 that she would be compulsorily discharged.

Access to healthcare

The Supreme Court of Korea has ruled that in order for a person to be eligible for gender affirming care they must be over 20 years of age, single, and without children. In the case of male-to-female gender reassignment operations, the person must prove issues related to draft resolved by either serving or being exempted. 

Surveys indicate that healthcare professionals in South Korea tend to hold strongly negative opinions of transgender individuals. It has also been found that healthcare providers with higher knowledge of trans people and trans issues had more positive dispositions towards trans people, but that healthcare providers with negative views tended to involve themselves much more heavily with the collection of data regarding trans people.

Intersex Peoples 
In Korea, intersex people are largely ignored or marginalized because of the lack of familiarity with the term "intersex" itself and because of the general stigma that surrounds intersex people. As a result, intersex people are faced with a lack of access to medical services and some are even pushed to getting "genital normalizing surgery" without informed consent. This concept of medicalizing intersex people is still very prevalent in Korea and perpetuates the social diagnosis of intersex people as "diseased" or having to receive surgical "normalization." To mitigate these problems, in October 2015, South Korea joined the International Lesbian, Gay, Bisexual, Trans, and Intersex Association (ILGA) and have started increasing the number of articles and information on intersex people that are published nationwide to increase general knowledge about intersex people.

Conversion therapy
According to a 2016 survey, 16.1% of LGBT people who had come out were recommended to undergo conversion therapy. Of these, 65.4% said it had a harmful impact on their lives, with 94% experiencing psychological trauma. A 2017 survey further reported that 58% of LGBT individuals who experienced conversion therapy in the past are still negatively affected by it in the present. Furthermore, studies have shown that 40% of LGBT respondents have claimed to have experienced homophobic statements or discriminatory treatment by counselors for conversion therapy.

Blood donation
South Korea forbids people who have had sex "with certain high-risk individuals" within the past one year to donate blood. These rules apply equally to all people, regardless of their sexual orientation or gender identity. The official guidelines urge people to not donate for the purposes of finding out if they have AIDS.

Living Conditions 
Homosexuality remains quite taboo in South Korean society. The World Values Survey of 2005 to 2009 had shown that Korea was the second most-hostile country towards homosexuals among 17 countries surveyed. 

In 2022, NBC News producer Michael Mitsanas spent "months" documenting the LGBTQ+ experience in South Korea, according to Hallie Jackson. LGBTQ+ South Koreans who spoke to NBC News described a culture of "round-the-clock" discrimination and abuse. Rep. Jang Hye-yeong told NBC News that "just telling somebody that you are LGBTQ will certainly subject you to discrimination." Jeon-il, a gay bartender in Itaewon, told Mitsanas that holding hands with a partner in public is "basically impossible."  Yoo - who asked that NBC News withhold his full name, citing a fear of retribution - said he must "erase the queer to act masculine" while working his corporate job in Seoul, adding that he's "afraid" of what his coworkers would do "if they find out I'm gay." June Green, a trans-male bartender in Seoul, said he must make "a deeper voice whenever I leave my house, and even then, people still approach me to ask if I'm a guy or girl."

Young LGBT people in South Korea often face bullying and discrimination. A 2014 survey conducted by the GongGam Human Rights Law Foundation revealed that 54% of LGBT Korean youths reported being harassed previously by their classmates and fellow students. Students interviewed by Human Rights Watch described being excluded and ostracized, being targeted online, or being physically harassed. A 22-year-old lesbian woman recalled that once her sexual orientation became known at her secondary school, she was singled out for harassment and the students criticized  her saying: ‘You are homosexual, you’re dirty.’ A 22-year-old gay man, recalled that classmates in middle school used “gay” as a slur, targeting boys who were perceived to be gay. A 17-year-old girl recalled classmates saying that homosexuals should die. Students were also targeted if they were seen to be socializing too closely or intimately with same-sex peers. 

A 2017 study exploring the rates of suicide ideation and attempts within Korean LGBT adolescents revealed that those youth who identified as homosexual or bisexual reported highest rates of suicidal ideation and medically serious attempts.  Additional studies of suicide risk among youth revealed that LGBT youth in Korea experience extreme forms of bullying and discrimination that gives rise to higher rates of suicide attempts and risks.

Although many studies focus on discrimination that LGBT youths experience, discrimination based on sexual orientation or gender identity is not only faced by adolescents in Korea, but also by adults. A 2018 study revealed that 22.6% of LGB adults and 51.5% of transgender adults in Korea faced harsh discrimination and unfair treatment  within the past year. Similarly, surveys conducted on LGBT adults in Korea reveal that the proportion of bisexual and lesbian women who reported having depressive symptoms was significantly higher than heterosexual women in Korea. A 2022 study also revealed that those who had past experience with bullying and discrimination because of their sexual identity had 1.65 times more occurrences of unrestful and poor sleep quality compared to those that have not faced discrimination against their sexual identity. Unhealthy sleep is known to perpetuate stress and depressive symptoms and thus we can infer that LGBT people who face discrimination are at higher risk of depression and stress/anxiety.

Opposition to LGBT rights comes mostly from Christian opposition groups, particularly Protestants. In recent years, in part due to growing support for homosexuality and same-sex relationships from South Korean society at large, conservative groups have organized public events and marches against LGBT rights, as well counter-protests to pride parades, usually with signs urging LGBT people to "repent from their sins". These marches have been attended by thousands and by various politicians.

Identity Affirming Spaces 
In recent years, the combination of taboo, consumer capitalism, and gay-led gentrification (the so-called "gaytrification effect") of the Itaewon area has pushed new gay commercialization outside of Itaewon, while isolating those places remaining. This lack of visibility is also reflected in the low profile maintained by the few gay clubs in South Korea. There are a few in metropolitan areas, mostly in the foreign sector of Itaewon (especially in the section known as "Homo-hill").  However, Jong-no has been known to cater to non-Western clientele and has various gay-friendly shops, cafés, and gay-focused NGOs. A recent 2017 study insinuated the growth of a "gay lifestyle" community in Jong-no, a popular area in Seoul, where LGBT individuals feel safe in relatively heteronormative places. Though the study only looked at a well-known café, the famous Gay Bean, there are many other places in the Jong-no area that are considered straight but are growing increasingly welcoming of non-straight individuals.

Media
South Korea's first gay-themed magazine, Buddy, launched in 1998, and several popular gay-themed commercials have also aired.

In 1998, the film review authorities lifted a ban on portraying homosexual conduct in films.

Paving the way for television was the 2005 South Korean film The King and the Clown, a gay-themed movie based on a court affair between a king and his male jester. The movie became the highest-grossing in Korean film history, surpassing both Silmido and Taegukgi. The Korean title for The King and the Clown is "왕의 남자" which translates as "The King's Man" with the implication that it refers to the man as being the King's lover. Other recent movies include the 2008 film A Frozen Flower and No Regret by celebrated director Leesong hee-il, which starred at the 2006 Busan International Film Festival.

Mainstream Korean television shows have begun to feature gay characters and themes. In 2010, the soap opera Life Is Beautiful premiered on SBS broadcast TV, becoming the first prime-time drama to explore a gay male couple's relationship as their unwitting families set them up on dates with women. That same year, Personal Taste (also "Personal Preference") was broadcast on MBC and revolved around a straight man who pretends to be gay to become a woman's roommate. Before these was Coming Out, which debuted on cable channel tvN in late-night in 2008, in which a gay actor and straight actress counseled gays with publicly acknowledging their sexual orientation.

Openly LGBT entertainment figures include model and actress Harisu, a trans woman who makes frequent appearances on television. Actor Hong Seok-cheon, after coming out in 2000 and being fired from his job, has since returned to his acting career. He has appeared in several debate programs in support of gay rights.

Popular actor Kim Ji-hoo, who was openly gay, died of suicide by hanging on 8 October 2008. Police attributed his suicide to public prejudice against homosexuality.

"The Daughters of Bilitis", a KBS Drama Special about the lives of lesbian women, aired on 7 August 2011. Immediately after it aired, internet message boards lit up with outraged protesters who threatened to boycott the network. The production crew eventually shut down the online re-run service four days after the broadcast.

XY She, a KBS Joy cable talk show about male-to-female (MTF) transgender individuals, was virtually cancelled after its first episode due to public opposition. The network cited concern over attacks on MCs and other cast-members as the official reason for cancellation.

In 2013, movie director Kim Jho Kwang-soo and his partner Kim Seung-hwan became the first South Korean gay couple to publicly wed, although it was not a legally recognized marriage.

In 2016, a Christian broadcasting company was sanctioned by the Korea Communications Standards Commission for broadcasting an anti-LGBTI interview on a radio program, in which the interviewee claimed that, if an "anti-discrimination law for LGBTI people" is passed, "pedophilia, bestiality, etc. will be legalized" and that South Korea "will become stricken with unspeakable diseases such as AIDS".

In March 2016, the K-pop girl group Mercury debuted with member Choi Han-bit, a transgender model, actress, and now singer. In January 2018, singer Holland became the first openly gay K-pop idol in South Korea to debut, releasing his song "Neverland".

In 2017, the film Method was released. The film talks about a gay relationship between an actor and an idol. In 2020, the television series Itaewon Class began airing. The show prominently features a transgender supporting character played by actress Lee Joo-young, as well as cameo appearances by Hong Seok-cheon.

In May 2020, multiple media outlets linked a cluster of COVID-19 cases to a gay bar in Seoul.

In January 2022, the zombie-themed Netflix series All Of Us Are Dead was released. One of the central characters, named Park Mi-Jin, is shown to have a crush on her friend Jang Ha-ri, another female. While the relationship hasn't officially happened thus far, it's still very possible for it to be official.

Pride parades

The Seoul Queer Culture Festival, also known as the "Korea Queer Culture Festival" or simply "Seoul Pride", is the largest LGBT event in the country. It was first held in 2000 when only 50 attended and turnout has increased every year since then. In 2015, following protests by conservative Christian groups, the Seoul Metropolitan Police Agency banned the event citing public safety concerns and traffic disruption as the reasons. The decision was overturned by the Seoul Administrative Court, allowing the parade to take place, which saw around 20,000 people participating. In 2016, there were 50,000 attendees. In July 2017, an estimated 85,000 people (according to the organizers) marched in the streets of Seoul in support of LGBT rights. Ahead of the 2018 event, around 220,000 people signed an online petition demanding that officials act to prevent the festival from taking place. However, the 2018 Seoul Pride parade took place and was attended by an estimated 120,000 people. In July 2019, conservative Christian groups again tried to block the festival, arguing that it "would be harmful to children and it would infringe on their rights". A court rejected their application as nonsensical. Days later, the 20th edition of the festival was held with approximately 150,000 participants.

Daegu has been holding annual pride marches since 2009, and Busan held its first pride event on 23 September 2017. In 2018, during the second gay pride in Busan, some 2,000 police officials were deployed to keep the event violence-free, and to protect the event's 15,000 attendees from violent anti-gay protesters. Gwangju and Jeju also held their first LGBT events in 2017. Gwangju's was a counter-protest to an anti-LGBT rally. The city organised its first official pride event the following year. Other cities, including Incheon and Jeonju, held their first pride events in 2018. Incheon officials initially denied permission to hold the LGBT event, citing a lack of parking. Organizers lodged an appeal and vowed to march irrespectively. The event took place and ended in violence after about 1,000 Christian protestors began violently attacking the participants. In April 2019, organizers of the gay pride event in Incheon filed charges against several Christian pastors who violently disrupted the event. They also lodged complaints with South Korea's national human rights body accusing police of inaction.

In May 2018, the first drag parade in South Korea took place with dozens attending the incident-free protest march in the capital Seoul.

In 2020, three cities gave up holding Queer Culture Festival due to COVID-19. The new media startup 'Dotface' held a queer parade online. People participated by making their avatars through dotface's homepage and uploading the avatars on Instagram with hashtag #우리는없던길도만들지 #온라인퀴퍼 (online Queer Parade).

Public opinion 
South Koreans have become significantly more accepting of homosexuality and LGBT rights in 2010 and the onward decade, even if conservative attitudes remain dominant. A 2013 Gallup poll found that 39% of people believed homosexuality should be accepted by society, compared to only 18% who held this view in 2007. South Korea recorded the most significant shift towards greater acceptance of homosexuality among the 39 countries surveyed worldwide. Significantly, there was a very large age gap on this issue: in 2013, 71% of South Koreans aged between 18 and 29 believed that homosexuality should be accepted, compared to only 16% of South Koreans aged 50 and over.

In April 2013, a Gallup poll, which was commissioned by a conservative Christian group, found that 25% of South Koreans supported same-sex marriage, while 67% opposed it and 8% did not know or refused to answer. However, a May 2013 Ipsos poll found that 26% of respondents were in favor of same-sex marriage and another 31% supported other forms of recognition for same-sex couples.

A 2017 Gallup Korea poll found that 58% of Koreans were against same-sex marriage, while 34% supported it and 8% remained undecided. Another poll in December 2017 conducted by Gallup for MBC and the Speaker of the National Assembly reported that 41% of South Koreans thought that same-sex marriage should be allowed, 53% were against it.

Public support for same-sex marriage is growing rapidly. In 2010, 31% and 21% of South Koreans in their 20s and 30s, respectively, supported the legalization of same-sex marriages. In 2014, these numbers had almost doubled to 60% and 40%. Support among people over 60, however, remained relatively unchanged (14% to 15%). These numbers were published by the Asan Institute for Policy Studies.

In February 2019, the "2018 Korea Social Integration Survey", which was conducted by the Korea Institute of Public Administration, revealed that those who said they "cannot accept homosexuals" fell below 50% for the first time in the survey's history. This percentage decreased from 62% in 2013 to 57% in 2017, to 49% in 2018. In 2018, the rest of those interviewed answered that they could accept them as either neighbors (31%), colleagues (15%), close friends (6%), or spouses (0.4%).

A 2020 Pew Research Center poll showed that 44% of South Koreans believed society should accept homosexuality. South Korea recorded the largest generational gap of the 34 countries surveyed, with 79% of 18–29-year-olds agreeing but only 23% of those aged 50 and over. Women (51%), the more educated (51%), those on the left of the political spectrum (67%), and the religiously unaffiliated (60%) were also more likely to agree.

According to a poll in May 2021, 81% of the respondents said no to the question "Is it fair to fire a worker based on their sexuality?" and 12% said yes.  In terms of marriage equality, 38% were in favour of same-sex marriage while 52% were against it.

Politics 
In the 2008 legislative election, Choi Hyun-sook became the first openly LGBT parliamentary candidate in the country. As an openly lesbian candidate, she ran for the New Progressive Party. Her party did not win any seats during the election.

The United Future Party is opposed to LGBT rights, the Seoul Queer Culture Festival, anti-discrimination protections for LGBT people and same-sex marriage. Some of its members have made many public homophobic statements.

Political support for LGBT rights is limited in South Korea due to the significant lobbying power exerted by conservative Christian groups. Support for LGBT rights is limited even from the otherwise Democratic Party of Korea and its leader, former human rights lawyer and South Korean President Moon Jae-in. During the 2017 presidential election, in which he emerged victorious, Moon stated that he opposed homosexuality, and that gay soldiers could undermine the Korean military. Moon faced criticism from gay rights advocates for his inconsistent position on minority rights, given that he was prepared to backtrack on previous support for civil unions and sacrifice LGBT rights in order to win votes from conservative Christian voters. Moon later said that he opposed same-sex marriage while also opposing discrimination against homosexual people. Only one of the 14 presidential candidates in 2017, the Justice Party's Sim Sang-jung, expressed clear support for LGBT rights and introducing discrimination protections for LGBT people.

During South Korea's 2018 elections, openly transgender candidate Kim Ki-hong (김기홍) ran for a seat in the National Assembly of South Korea. Kim ran again under the Green Party Korea in 2020 for the National Assembly of South Korea. Due to transphobic abuse Kim endured during the campaign, they decided to end their life on February 24, 2021.

During the 2019 Seoul Queer Culture Festival, the Justice Party and the Green Party participated in the event. Some members of the ruling Democratic Party of Korea (DPK) also participated, including Keum Tae-sup. This is believed to be the first participation of the DPK at the event.

In October 2019, speaking to Buddhist and Christian religious leaders, President Moon Jae-in said, "A national consensus should be the priority for same-sex marriage. However, regarding the human rights of sexual minorities, they should not be socially persecuted or discriminated against."

Censorship issues 

The Government of South Korea practiced censorship of gay content websites from 2001 to 2003, through its Information and Communications Ethics Committee (정보통신윤리위원회), an official organ of the Ministry of Information and Communication. That practice has since been ended.

The South Korean Government has been criticized for the lack of protection for LGBT people. As of 2020, South Korea has no national law preventing discrimination on the basis of sexual orientation, which places it at the bottom of the list of OECD countries in regard to LGBT rights. In addition, South Korea's aggressive track and test method to the COVID-19 pandemic resulted in several LGBT South Koreans being outed by either the press or by the public government records related to testing. A cluster of cases was linked to a gay bar in Seoul in May 2020, with all of those in attendance having their personal characteristics, and in some cases also their occupation, released to the public. In a country with no protections, the idea of being listed in public government records as LGBT is "insurmountable" and can lead to "long-term negative social effects". Several LGBT people who had visited the bar decided not to report their positive COVID status. Government officials announced anonymous testing procedures later that month. Several COVID clusters were also linked to notoriously homophobic Christian churches or organizations.

Etymology 
The Korean word for "homosexual" is dongseongaeja ("same-sex lover"). A less politically correct term is dongseongyeonaeja (Hangul: 동성연애자; Hanja: 同性戀愛者). South Korean homosexuals, however, make frequent use of the term ibanin  (Hangul: 이반인; Hanja: 異般人 also 二般人) which can be translated as "different type person", and is usually shortened to iban (Hangul: 이반; Hanja: 異般). The word is a direct play on the word ilban-in (Hangul: 일반인; Hanja: 一般人) meaning "normal person" or  "ordinary person". In addition, English loanwords are used in South Korea to describe LGBT people. These words are simple transliterations of English words into hangul: lesbian is lejeubieon or yeoseongae (Hangul: 레즈비언 or 여성애; Hanja: 女性愛), gay is gei or namseongae (Hangul: 게이 or 남성애; Hanja: 男性愛), queer is  kuieo (Hangul: 퀴어), transgender is teuraenseujendeo (Hangul: 트랜스젠더), and bisexual is yangseongaeja (Hangul: 양성애자; Hanja: 兩性愛者).

Summary table

See also

Chingusai
Human rights in South Korea
LGBT rights in Asia
LGBTQI health in South Korea
Recognition of same-sex unions in South Korea
Solidarity for LGBT Human Rights of Korea
Yun Hyon-seok

References

Further reading

External links
 Official website of Buddy, Korean LGBT Magazine. (in Korean)
 Official website of Chingusai, one of Korea's oldest gay men's organizations. (in Korean)
 Official website of the Korean Queer Culture Festival. (in Korean)
 Official website of the Korean Sexual-Minority Culture and Rights Center. (in Korean)
 Official website of RAinbowTEEN (Rateen), LGBT youth group. (in Korean)
 Official website of the Lesbian Counseling Center in South Korea. (in Korean)

Articles
 Religion and Public Perceptions of Gays and Lesbians in South Korea by Timothy S. Rich. July 2017
 From 50 to 1,500: Korea Queer Culture Festival turns 10 by Matt Kelley. 16 June 2009
 South Korea's legal trans-formation by Matt Kelley and Mike Lee. 29 May 2009
 The deadly reality of South Korea's virtual world by Matt Kelley and Mike Lee. 17 October 2008
 2 openly gay, trans South Korean actors commit suicide by Matt Kelley. 9 October 2008
 Seoul's spring forecast: More visibility for Korea's queers by Matt Kelley. 3 June 2008
 South Korea sees first openly gay politician, but challenges persist for the nation's lesbians by Matt Kelley. 18 March 2008
 Seoul policeman comes out, fights prejudice by News Editor. 11 January 2008
 Exclusion from non-discrimination bill mobilises Korea's LGBT community by Matt Kelley. 23 November 2007
 2007 Seoul LGBT film festival, 6 to 10 June by News Editor. 6 June 2007

 
South Korea